Champions is a Pakistani youth-based reality show that airs on BOL Network. The episodes are also available online. Season 1 of the series premiered on 4 November 2019 and ended on 16 December 2020. It was followed by Season 2, which premiered on 18 December 2021.

Filming of the show takes place at the BOL House in Korangi Creek Cantonment, Karachi, which partially serves as Bol Network's headquarters. In Season 1, contestants lived in the house for 30 days from 4 January to 4 February 2020 until four finalists emerged.

The show was banned by PEMRA on 10 April 2020 citing telecast of vulgar and indecent content. In regard to the ban and the impact of the COVID-19 pandemic, the show was temporarily suspended without announcing a winner. After a hiatus of 6 months, the series continued airing the remaining episodes in November 2020 concluding with a two-part Grand Finale where Hammad Ali Khan from Karachi was crowned winner of the season.

Champions was the subject of viewer complaints and press attention regarding a variety of controversial issues, including vulgarity, the well-being of certain participants, and discrimination based on sexuality and color. Despite receiving criticism for its graphic nature throughout its run, the series became one of the most-watched television telecasts in Pakistan. The eighteenth episode of the series attracted 15 million viewers, making it Bol Network's most-watched broadcast. As the series entered March, viewership declined sharply amidst favoritism and clickbaiting complaints from audiences.

Format
The show is a Pakistani adaptation of the Indian reality show Bigg Boss. Hosted by Waqar Zaka, it used a mixed format which incorporated open auditions for contestant selection who were then later confined to a Big Brother-style surveillance house. The contestants would leave the house occasionally to perform tasks where performance outcomes along with nominations would result in elimination of one or more housemates. Waqar Zaka has stated on numerous occasions that the competition has no specific format.

Contestants
Ages, names, and cities stated are at time of filming.

Episodes

Progress history

  This contestant(s) was eliminated
  This contestant won the elimination challenge 
  This contestant won the elimination challenge and returned to the competition
  This contestant was eliminated but returned to the competition as a Wild Card Challenger
  This contestant was granted power to directly eliminate contestant(s)
  This contestant returned to the competition
  This contestant was fake evicted

Notes

Reception
Champions received a polarized response from television critics and gained widespread popularity with audiences. Based on 168 reviews collected by IMDb, the show has an average score of 7.6/10. Viewership peaked at a near 15 million live viewers on 17 February 2020 (Episode 18) which marked the episode as one of the most-watched television telecasts in Pakistan and Bol Network's highest viewing figures to date. Episodes made available on YouTube following the live telecast received over 2 million views in a 24-hour span and were trending on YouTube in Pakistan and India over the course of respective weekly releases. Ratings declined subsequently in episodes that followed. Critics compared the series to a soap opera commenting that the episodes contain merely 10 minutes of watch-worthy content which is made up into a 90-minute episode. The series was also accused of clickbaiting viewers for the majority of the episodes. The content shown in teasers and thumbnails is usually flashy and falsely advertised to appear in the coming week and does not actually unfold until a few weeks later.

Criticism and controversy

Selection of certain housemates
The programme attracted criticism in December 2019 for putting several vulnerable people through the auditions. Rabail Sheikh, an aspiring model, who had a history of substance abuse and suffered from intermittent explosive disorder, was selected after she attempted to expose a cricketer by threatening to leak a lewd video as leverage. There was no psychological test done to screen any participants to determine whether they were fit to enter the house. Muhammad Yahya had an arm disability, Muhammad Bilal had a cleft palate and difficulty in speaking, and Daniya Kanwal who suffered from asthma were all selected in auditions as token diversity.

Legal complications and censorship
During the auditions Rabail revealed that she has a private video of a famous Pakistani cricketer who had allegedly stripped down on webcam and showed her his genitals in the video. The video was blurred during the telecast and Rabail was persuaded to delete it in order for her to get selected as a contestant. However, it is alleged that the video is still in the possession of Rabail. Hareem Shah and Sandal Khattak appeared during auditions and discussed their media scandals in detail on the show. They claimed to have videos and audio recordings of news anchor Mubashir Lucman and Interior Minister Sheikh Rasheed. Prior to the show, they had released several snippets of their conversation with Lucman and Rasheed as evidence which became popular on social media in mid-2019. Waqar Zaka revealed that Bol Network had received threats from Lucman's team to pursue legal action against the network to stop the telecast of the episodes featuring Shah and Khattak. Shah and Khattak were selected to become housemates but did not enter the house amidst these complications.

On 10 April 2020, Pakistan Electronic Media Regulatory Authority (PEMRA) passed the motion to ban the show and imposed an Rs. 1 million fine on the network. The notice cited vulgarity and indecency of content being telecast and that it did not align with the religious, social, and cultural values of the country as the reason for the ban. As a result, no winner was announced and the cash prize was not awarded to any of the finalists.

Discrimination and abuse
The production was heavily criticized for its leniency towards unacceptable behavior among housemates and telecasting strong themes under the pretense of family show. Caste-based discrimination and colorism were primary underlying themes in conversations inside the house. Bol Network received 1574 complaints after Episode 17 was aired regarding Rabail and Aamir's behavior toward Kashaf. Rabail alongside Aamir called Kashaf dark, fat and ugly on several instances, spat on her, destroyed her clothes and physically assaulted her repeatedly after an elimination task. On a separate occasion Rabail sprayed Daniya with an aerosol spray triggering an asthma attack for which she had to be hospitalized for the night. Rabail was disqualified but made to stay on the show to garner more ratings hence rewarding her behavior.

Rabail, on day 2, outed Hammad telling housemates that he had confided in her about the past lover he mentioned during auditions being a man. Previous to this incident many housemates including Daniya, Tooba, and Sidra had referred to Hammad as meetha a derogatory term used in Urdu for homosexual or effeminate men. Hammad came out as straight on his YouTube channel after he was evicted.

References

External links
 
 

BOL Network
Pakistani reality television series
Race-related controversies in television
Television controversies in Pakistan
2019 Pakistani television series debuts
Pakistani television series based on non-Pakistani television series